Constance Jocelyn Ffoulkes (1858–1950) was a British art historian, translator, and scholar of Italian Renaissance art. She participated in the adoption of the 'historical standpoint' method of research, a shift in art criticism that emerged in the early twentieth century. She was a student of Giovanni Morelli and his methods of connoisseurship, which involved assembling subtle clues and recognition of personal technique, the artist's 'hand', to determine a work's provenance and creators. She translated Morelli's Kunstkritische Studien über italienische Malerei and was instrumental in the communication of Morelli's methods and legacy.

Ffoulkes' own techniques involved the investigation of historical documentation, which came to be used by many modern art historians in support of their conclusions. For example, her article on Vincenzo Foppa published in The Burlington Magazine in 1903 made use of a document from an archive in Brescia to establish Foppa's death date. Ffoulkes' works include contributions to the Encyclopedia Britannica, instruction on scientific methodologies for analysis of artworks, the first major study of Vincenzo Foppa (c. 1427–1515), and contributions to the journals Repertorium für Kunstwissenschaft, Rassegna d’arte, The Burlington Magazine, and The Magazine of Art.

References

Further reading 

 Ventrella, Francesco. “Feminine Inscriptions in the Morellian Method.” In Migrating Histories of Art: Self-Translations of a Discipline, edited by Maria Teresa Costa and Hans Christian Hönes, 37–58. Studien Aus Dem Warburg-Haus 19. De Gruyter, 2019. https://doi.org/10.1515/9783110491258-004

1858 births
1950 deaths
Leonardo da Vinci scholars
British art historians
Women art historians